Elections to Cumbria County Council were held on 5 May 1977. This was on the same day as other UK county council elections. The whole council of 82 members was up for election and the Conservative Party gained control of the council, which had previously been under no overall control.

Results

References

Cumbria
1977
1970s in Cumbria